Cicerbita alpina, commonly known as the alpine sow-thistle or alpine blue-sow-thistle is a perennial herbaceous species of plant sometimes placed in the genus Cicerbita of the family Asteraceae, and sometimes placed in the genus Lactuca as Lactuca alpina. It is native to upland and mountainous parts of Europe.

It was once used as an herb in Sami cooking, and known as jierja.

Description
The stem is erect and usually unbranched. It has glandular hairs and contains a white milky juice, a kind of latex. The alternate leaves are broad, triangular and clasping the stem, bluish-grey beneath, hairy along the veins and with toothed margins. The inflorescence is a panicle. The individual blue-violet florets are tongue-like with a toothed, truncated tip, each having five stamens and a fused carpel. All the florets are ray florets; there are no disc florets. The seeds are clothed in unbranched hairs. The flowering period extends from June to September in the temperate northern hemisphere.

Distribution and habitat
Cicerbita alpina grows on many mountains of Europe (the Alps, the Pyrenees, the northern Apennines, the Scandinavian Peninsula, Scotland (where it is endangered and found in only four known locations), the Carpathians and the Urals.

Conservation
It became a protected species in the UK in 1975 under the Conservation of Wild Creatures and Wild Plants Act.

Ecology
In Finland, this plant is known as "bear-hay" because the Eurasian brown bear feeds on it, as do elk and reindeer. People also sometimes make use of it and eat it raw or cooked in reindeer milk.

Secondary metabolites 
The edible shoots of Cicerbita alpina contain 8-O-Acetyl-15-beta-D-glucopyranosyllactucin, which causes the bitter taste of the vegetable, and caffeic acid derivatives chlorogenic acid, 3,5-dicaffeoylquinic acid, caffeoyltartaric acid, and cichoric acid.

Gallery

References

 Pignatti S. - Flora d'Italia - Edagricole – 1982. vol. III

External links
Cicerbita alpina Plant Life, United Kingdom
 Biolib, Czech Botany
 Zipcode Zoo, Cicerbita alpina
 Cicerbita alpina image gallery, Flower Pictures United States

Cichorieae
Flora of Europe
Flora of the Alps
Flora of the Pyrenees
Plants described in 1753
Taxa named by Carl Linnaeus
Taxobox binomials not recognized by IUCN